Douglas Patrick Harrison is a Professor Emeritus of Chemical Engineering from Louisiana State University's Gordon A. and Mary Cain Department of Chemical Engineering, where he taught undergraduate and graduate classes and served as dissertations advisor to Ph.D. and M.S. students.  He held the Department Chair position, occupied the Marguerite Voorhies Professor endowed chair, and managed several research projects since his retirement in 2005.

Biography
Douglas P. Harrison received his Ph.D. from the University of Texas in 1966.  After three years with Monsanto, he joined Louisiana State University's Chemical Engineering department in 1969 as an Assistant Professor. Later, he served as Department Chair from 1976 to 1979 and became the Alexis and Marguerite Voorhies Endowed Professor. Throughout his career, Harrison has been invited to lecture at conferences and colleges including Engineering Conferences International, United Engineering Foundation, American Institute of Chemical Engineers, University of Cambridge, and NATO Advanced Studies Institute. In 2005, after 36 years of service with LSU, he retired from teaching.

Teaching
During his time, Harrison taught mostly undergraduate courses. After his time as Department Chair, he continued working closely with the chemical engineering graduate program as a doctoral and master's dissertation advisor. He helped 10 Ph.D. students and 31 M.S. students complete their programs. He is the only professor to receive the Dow Chemical Excellence in Teaching Award four times (in 1988, 1995, 2000 and 2002).

Research
Much of Harrison's research has been focused on separation and reaction engineering. His work has mainly been focused on non-catalytic gas–solid reactions and the separation of gas associated with coal-fired power plants. His other research includes new processes for the production of high hydrogen purity, the removal of greenhouse gasses from Stack Gas (flue gas), and the separation of semi-volatile contaminants from aqueous solutions.

He continues his work in "High Efficiency Desulfurization of Synthesis Gas". Hydrogen sulfide is a pollutant and its removal helps improve the efficiency of the reaction. Past research has included the use of CeO to Ce2O2S for desulfurization. Current research is with the Sorbent CeO2-ZrO2 to reduce the hydrogen sulfide content to sub-ppm content. This research is supported by the US Department of Energy and is being used to help meet their Vision 21 project, a super-clean power production facility. He was part of the organizing committee for the 1996 NATO Advanced Studies Institute in Kuşadası, Turkey.

This research is working toward making an economical solution to retrofit existing stacks on power plants to reduce emissions of carbon dioxide, one of the products of a combustion reaction and regarded as a pollutant thought to be a cause to of Global Warming. This project is also supported by the Department of Energy and Research Triangle Institute in North Carolina and can be utilized in the completion of the Vision 21 project. He was also published in the International Journal of Environmental Technology and Management 2004 – Vol. 4 for his work in this area.

Another area of his research is new hydrogen production methods. With Professor Armando Corripio and support from NASA and TDA, he has been researching how to produce 95+% hydrogen with a single reactor, a process that currently takes three vessels. Other groups in the US, Japan, and Norway are also incorporating his work into their research, and in 2001 he was invited to the 4th Advanced Clean Coal International Symposium in Tokyo to lecture on this topic. For his work in this area, along with colleagues at Los Alamos National Laboratory, Harrison received one of 30 awards in 2001 from the Federal Laboratory Consortium for advancing "Technology in Service to Society."

He currently holds a patent along with Klaus S. Lackner and Hans Zoick for Hydrogen Production from Carbonaceous materials.

Awards, grants and patents 
Masuda Research Fellowship award
LSU Teaching Dow Award (1988, 1995, 2000, 2002)
One of 30 Federal Laboratory Consortium awards, along with colleagues at Los Alamos, for advancing "Technology in Service to Society"
Along with Klaus S. Lackner and Hans Zoick of Earth and Environmental Sciences from Los Alamos, Harrison received U.S. Patent #6,790,430 for Hydrogen Production from Carbonaceous Material.
Along with Dr. Armando Corripio, received a grant from TDA Research in association with NASA for the project, "A novel hydrogen/oxygen generation system."

Published works 
"Evaluation of Candidate Solids for High-Temperature Desulfurization of Low-BTU Gases" with P.R. Westmoreland in Environmental Science & Technology Volume: 10 Issue: 7 Published 1976 
"Comparative Kinetics of High-Temperature Reaction Between H2S and Selected Metal-Oxides" with P.R. Westmoreland in Environmental Science & Technology Volume: 11 Issue: 5 Published 1977 
"Laboratory Investigations of Cascade Crossflow Packed Towers for Air Stripping of Volatile Organics from Groundwater" with Douglas P. Harrison, Kalliat T. Valsaraj, Louis J. Thibodeaux, United States. Air Force Civil Engineering Support Agency, Louisiana State University (Baton Rouge, La.). Hazardous Waste Research Center.
"Zero Emission Coal" published in Energy 2000: The Beginning of a New Millennium : ENERGEX 2000 : Proceedings of the 8th International Energy Forum, Las Vegas, July 23–28, 2000 with Hans-Jaochim Ziock and Klause S. Lackner.
 "Low-Carbon Monoxide Hydrogen by Sorption" along with research partner Zhiyong Peng; International Journal of Chemical Reactor Engineering Vol. 1: A37
 "Hydrogen from methane in a single-step process," with Balasubramanian, B., A. Lopez Ortiz, and S. Kaytakoglu, Chemical Engineering Science 54 (1999) 3543–3552
 "Direct Comparison of Countercurrent and Cascade Crossflow Air Stripping Under Field Conditions", with S. Verma, K.T. Valsaraj, and D.M. Wetzel, Water Research, 28, 2253 (1994).
 "Simultaneous Shift Reaction and Carbon Dioxide Separation for the Direct Production of Hydrogen", with C. Han, Chemical Engineering Science, 49, 5875 (1994)
 "High Temperature Capture of : Characteristics of the Reversible Reaction Between CaO(s) and (g)",  with A. Silaban, Chemical Engineering Communications, 137, 177 (1995)
 "Advanced Sulfur Control Concepts. I." with A. Lopez, J. White, and F.R. Groves, Proceedings of the Symposium on Advanced Coal-Fired Power Systems '95, Morgantown, WV, June 1995, DOE/METC-95/1018, Vol. 2, p. 610.
 "A Calcium Oxide Sorbent Process for Bulk Separation of Carbon Dioxide. VI.", with C. Han and G. Lee, Proceedings of the Symposium on Advanced Coal-Fired Power Systems '95, Morgantown, WV, June 1995, DOE/METC-95/1018, Vol. 2, p. 655.
 "High Temperature Capture of : Characteristics of the Reversible Reaction Between CaO(s) and (g)," with A. Silaban, Chemical Engineering Communications, 137, 177 (1995).
 "Control of Gaseous Contaminants in IGCC Power Systems, An Overview," Proceedings of the 12th Annual International Pittsburgh Coal Conference, September 1995, p. 1047 (invited review paper).
 "Advanced Sulfur Control Concepts for Hot Gas Desulfurization. II.," with J. White, A. Lopez-Ortiz, W.-N. Huang, and F.R. Groves, Proceedings of the Symposium on Advanced Coal-Fired Power Systems '96, Morgantown, W.V., July 1996, DOE/METC-97/1039 (on CD-ROM).
 "Performance Analysis of ZnO-Based Sorbents in Removal of H2S from Fuel Gas," presented at the NATO/ASI Symposium on Desulfurization of Hot Coal Gas With Regenerable Metal Oxide Sorbents, Kusasadi, Turkey, July 1996, proceedings to be published.
 "Regeneration of Sulfided Sorbents and Direct Production of Elemental Sulfur," presented at the NATO/ASI Symposium on Desulfurization of Hot Coal Gas With Regenerable Metal Oxide Sorbents, Kuşadası, Turkey, July 1996, proceedings to be published.
 "Characteristics of the Reversible Reaction Between (g) and Calcined Dolomite," with A. Silaban and M. Narcida, Chemical Engineering Communications, 147, 149 (1996).
 "On the Performance of a Cascade Crossflow Air Stripping Column," with Y. Akiyama, K.T. Valsaraj, and D.M. Wetzel, Industrial and Engineering Chemistry Research, 35, 3597 (1996).
 "Multicycle Performance of the  Acceptor in a Single-Step Process for H2 Production," with C. Han, Separation Science and Technology, 32, 681, 1997.
 "Elemental Sulfur Production During the Regeneration of Iron Oxide High-Temperature Desulfurization Sorbent," with J. White and F.R. Groves, accepted for publication in Catalysis Today (special issue devoted to environmental reaction engineering)
 "Capture of carbon dioxide from flue gas using solid regenerable sorbents" with David A. Green, Brian S. Turk, Raghubir P. Gupta, Jeffery W. Portzer, and William J. McMichael, International Journal of Environmental Technology and Management 2004 – Vol. 4, No.1/2  pp. 53 – 67
"Electrosynthesis of Nanocrystalline Ceria-Zirconia" with A. Mukherjee, and E. J. Podlaha, Electrochem. Solid-State Lett., Volume 4, Issue 9, pp. D5-D7 (September 2001).

See also 
Flue Gas Desulfurization
Chemical Engineering
Sorbents
Syngas

References

External links
Department of Energy Vision 21 Project
LSU Department BIO
"Low-Carbon Monoxide Hydrogen by Sorption-Enhanced Reaction" by Harrison and Zhiyong Peng
STTR Phase I Awards
"Hydrogen Production from Carbonaceous Material" patent information
"Capture of carbon dioxide from flue gas using solid regenerable sorbents"
"A Calcium Oxide Sorbent Process for Bulk Separation of Carbon Dioxide"
"Hot Gas Desulfurization With Sulfur Recovery"
"High Efficiency Desulfurization of Synthesis Gas: III"
Chemical Engineering Receives $2.9 million Grant to Study Ethanol

Living people
American chemical engineers
Louisiana State University faculty
Year of birth missing (living people)